North Carolina FC U23 is an American soccer team based in Cary, North Carolina.  It was founded in 2002 as the Raleigh Elite, and the current affiliate of North Carolina FC, a third division club in the United Soccer League.  The team plays in USL League Two (the fourth tier of the American Soccer Pyramid), and previously in the National Premier Soccer League (NPSL). The team was known as the Cary Clarets in 2008 and 2009; and went dormant for a year in 2010.  As a member of the USASA League, the then-Carolina RailHawks U23's took the Men's Region III Championship in 2011, 2012, and 2013 and won the U-23's National Championship in 2011 and 2013.  The team's colors are navy blue, gold, and cardinal red.

History

The Raleigh CASL Elite entered the PDL for the first time in 2002, and was run by the Raleigh-based Capital Area Soccer League (CASL).  They finished their first competitive campaign second in the Mid-Atlantic Division (behind Williamsburg Legacy) with an 11–7–0 record; and made the playoffs.  They overcame Northeast Division champions Vermont Voltage 1–0 in the Conference Semi-finals before falling to the Cape Cod Crusaders in the Eastern Conference final.  Raleigh enjoyed a brief foray into the US Open Cup thanks to their positive early season form, knocking out D3 Pro League side Carolina Dynamo 5–2 in the first round before losing 3–0 to A-League stalwarts Richmond Kickers in the second.

Raleigh Elite finished third in the Mid Atlantic Division in 2003, with an 8–8–2 record, 17 points behind divisional champions Richmond Kickers Future.  Chris Norbet was Elite's top scorer, with seven goals; while John Izzo contributed three assists for the season.

Elite finished in fourth place behind divisional champs Carolina Dynamo with a 7–9–2 record in 2004.

In 2005 Elite enjoyed a productive season, losing just four games.  The Elite were high-scoring entertainers throughout the year.  They finished in third place in the Mid Atlantic Division, one point behind the Carolina Dynamo.  That year, Aaron King was Raleigh's top scorer, with ten goals, while Spencer Wadsworth contributed an impressive eight assists.

Prior to the beginning of the 2006 season, the CASL organization severed ties with them, and the team was taken over by the Morrisville, North Carolina-based Next Level Academy, who renamed it the Raleigh Elite.  The new Elite took a step backwards in 2006, which saw them win just four games all season.  Willy Guadarrama was Raleigh's top scorer, with nine goals; Guadarrama and Michael Harrington contributed four assists each.

Cary RailHawks U23
In March 2007, the Next Level Academy formed a partnership with the then new USL First Division team, the Carolina RailHawks, who subsequently became the team's parent professional club, and the team was renamed the Cary RailHawks U23s.  The RailHawks, endured yet another disappointing season not notching their first win until the fourth game of the season.  Schilawski and Sassano were the RailHawks' top scorers, with four and five goals respectively, while Joe Germanese contributed four assists.

The RailHawks made a push for the playoffs in 2008.  They ended the year third in the Southeast Division, just five points behind second place Bradenton Academics.  Brian Shriver and Ronnie Bouemboue were Cary's top scorers, with six and five goals respectively, while Corben Bone contributed four assists.

Renamed 2008–2009

In November 2008, Next Level Academy announced a partnership with Burnley Football Club, then a member of the English Championship, in order to jointly develop professional footballers.  As part of the agreement, the team was renamed the Cary Clarets in USL PD League before withdrawing at the end of the 2009 season.  The team was dormant in 2010.

Badges

Name reverted
In 2011, the once again re-christened Carolina RailHawks U-23s made it to the USASA Men's U-23 Region III Championship and National Championship.

The Carolina RailHawks U-23's won the 2011, 2012, and 2013 USASA U-23's Region III Championship. In 2011 and 2013 the team also won the USASA U-23's National Championship. In January 2014, the team announced they would enter the NPSL for the upcoming season competing in the Mid-Atlantic Conference of the South Region.

Name changed
The team was renamed to Carolina RailHawks NPSL on April 7, 2016. This was to allow players 23 and older to play.

Players

Listed squad for 2017 season

Year-by-year

Honors
 USL PDL Eastern Conference Champion 2009
 USASA Region III U-23 Champions 2011; 2012; 2013
 USASA U-23 National Champions 2011; 2013

Head coaches
  Damon Nahas (2005–2006)
  Sean Nahas (2007)
  Dewan Bader (2008–2014) 
  Luis Satorra (2015)
  Dewan Bader (2016–2018)

Stadia
 WakeMed Soccer Park; Cary, North Carolina (2003–2008, 2011–present)
 Middle Creek Park; Cary, North Carolina (2009)

Average attendance
Attendance stats are calculated by averaging each team's self-reported home attendances from the historical match archive at https://web.archive.org/web/20100105175057/http://www.uslsoccer.com/history/index_E.html.
 2005: 480
 2006: 140
 2007: 222
 2008: unknown
 2009: 114

References

External links
 of North Carolina FC
Next Level Academy

Association football clubs established in 2002
Sports in Raleigh-Durham
Soccer clubs in North Carolina
North Carolina FC
Reserve soccer teams in the United States
National Premier Soccer League teams
2002 establishments in North Carolina